Lutsu may refer to several places in Estonia:

Lutsu, Harju County, village in Kose Parish, Harju County
Lutsu, Põlva County, village in Põlva Parish, Põlva County
Lutsu, Valga County, village in Valga Parish, Valga County